Lee Dair (born 28 May 1977), is a Scottish former professional footballer. He has played in the Scottish Football League First Division for Raith Rovers and now coaches in the East of Scotland football leagues.

Dair is currently the assistand manager of East of Scotland team Hill of Beath Hawthorn alongside his brother Jason Dair.

Career
Dair began his career with Rangers but never made a competitive appearance for the Ibrox club. He joined Raith Rovers in August 1997, succeeding his brother Jason who had just left Rovers for Millwall. After trial appearances for Cowdenbeath and Partick Thistle, Dair joined East Fife in November 1998.

Since 2003, Dair has had a long career in Junior football, his clubs including Hill of Beath Hawthorn, Linlithgow Rose, Ballingry Rovers and Oakley United.

After a brief spell as player-manager in 2010, Dair was appointed as manager of Ballingry for a second time in June 2014 but resigned the following October. He became manager of fellow Fife side Lochore Welfare later the same month before leaving this position in the summer of 2016.

Dair is the nephew of the late Rangers and Scotland legend Jim Baxter, while his father Ian played for Cowdenbeath, and won the Scottish Junior Cup with Glenrothes in 1975.

References

External links

Living people
1977 births
Scottish footballers
Rangers F.C. players
Raith Rovers F.C. players
Cowdenbeath F.C. players
Partick Thistle F.C. players
East Fife F.C. players
Hill of Beath Hawthorn F.C. players
Linlithgow Rose F.C. players
Ballingry Rovers F.C. players
Oakley United F.C. players
Lochore Welfare F.C. players
Scottish Football League players
Scottish Junior Football Association players
Association football midfielders
Scottish football managers